Yakov Nikolayevich Erlikh (born 3 June 1988) is a Russian professional football coach and a former player. He works as a conditioning coach for FC Ufa.

Biography
He made his Russian Football National League debut for FC Rostov on 25 May 2008 in a game against FC Zvezda Irkutsk.

In July 2008, Erlikh and fellow Russian Jew, Boris Rotenberg, joined Israeli club Hapoel Petah Tikva on trial. The club was interested in both their services since they are Jewish and would not count as foreigners.

In 2010 and 2012-2013 he played for Rotor Volgograd, and in 2014-2016 he played for FC Sakhalin Yuzhno-Sakhalinsk.

He played for FC Ocean Kerch.

See also
List of select Jewish football (association; soccer) players

Footnotes

External links
 Statistics at Statbox.ru 

1988 births
Sportspeople from Barnaul
Living people
Russian Jews
Jewish footballers
Russian footballers
Association football forwards
FC Dynamo Barnaul players
FC Rostov players
Maccabiah Games competitors for Russia
Maccabiah Games footballers
FC Metallurg Lipetsk players
FC Rotor Volgograd players
FC Sokol Saratov players
FC Sakhalin Yuzhno-Sakhalinsk players
Crimean Premier League players